Artur Józef Andrus (born 27 December 1971) is a Polish journalist, poet, singer-songwriter and cabaret artist. He is best known for his radio shows at Polskie Radio Program III, and as a master of ceremonies during various TV shows.

Andrus has published three books and released three albums. His 2012 album Myśliwiecka debuted at number 1 at Polish albums chart and was certified 2× Platinum in Poland. Andrus is a recipient of Gold Cross of Merit (2011) and Silver Cross of Merit (2005).

Career
Artur Andrus studied journalism at Warsaw University. He worked at Rozgłośnia Harcerska and Radio Rzeszów. His breakthrough was an interview with poet and singer Wojciech Młynarski, during which Andrus was rhyming when asking questions, and Młynarski was answering with improvised rhymes. After that, Andrus received an offer to run a radio show on Polskie Radio Program IV. Since 1994, he has worked in Polskie Radio Program III in "Powtórka z rozrywki" and "Akademia rozrywki" shows.

In December 2004, Andrus published a collection of songs and poems titled Popisuchy. Since 2005, he has been a commentator on a satirist TVN 24 show Szkło kontaktowe. On 2 December 2005, he released his first album, Łódzka.

In 2008, Polityka magazine released a set of 15 DVDs titled Kolekcja polskich kabaretów (A Collection of Polish Cabarets), which contained various cabaret performances selected by Andrus. That year, Andrus also starred in TV series Rodzina Trendych on TVP 2, and in an improvised soap opera parody Spadkobiercy, which was broadcast on Polsat from 2008 to 2009, and on TV 4 from 2009 to 2012.

In 2011, his second book, Każdy szczyt ma swój Czubaszek (an interview with Polish satirist Maria Czubaszek), was published.

In 2012, Andrus published a collection of his blog posts, Blog osławiony między niewiastami, and released his second studio album Myśliwiecka, which became a commercial success. The album debuted at number 1 on Polish Albums Chart, held that position for a total number of twelve weeks, and was certified 2× Platinum.

On 22 April 2012, Andrus' concert in Teatr Syrena in Warsaw was filmed, and released in April 2013 on a DVD titled Piłem w Spale... I co dalej?. The album debuted at number 5 on the Polish chart.

Publications
 Popisuchy (2004)
 Każdy szczyt ma swój Czubaszek (2011, with Maria Czubaszek)
 Blog osławiony między niewiastami (2012)

Discography

Studio albums

Live albums

References

External links

Artur Andrus in Filmpolski database
Artur Andrus in Filmweb database

1971 births
Living people
Polish male poets
Polish male singer-songwriters
Polish cabaret performers
Polish radio journalists
Polish television journalists
University of Warsaw alumni
Mystic Production artists
Recipients of the Silver Cross of Merit (Poland)
Recipients of the Gold Cross of Merit (Poland)
People from Lesko County
21st-century Polish male singers
21st-century Polish singers